Manipa Island is an island in West Seram Regency, Maluku Province, Indonesia. It is located 8 km off the western coast of Kelang at the western end of Seram Island and 25 km off the western coast of Buru. Including adjacent small islands, it covers an area of 159.71 km2. The inhabitants speak the Manipa language, as well as Indonesian and Ambonese Malay.

This island gives its name to the Manipa Strait between Buru and Seram.

Adjacent islands
Manipa has a number of small islands that are very close to its shores.
Masawi and Asamamonuke on a reef on its northeastern coast. 
Suanggi off its western tip. It is located in the Manipa Strait between Buru and Seram. 
Tuban in the south 
Luhu in the north.

References

External links
Old map of Manipa, Haruku, Saparua and Nusalaut

Islands of the Maluku Islands
Landforms of Maluku (province)
Populated places in Indonesia